The Thyssen family has notable members, all of whom descend from Friedrich Thyssen, who have established steel works, elevators and escalators, industrial conglomerates, banks, and art collections - Thyssen AG, ThyssenKrupp and ThyssenKrupp Marine Systems. Originating from Germany, family members have taken up residence in various countries.

Ancestors
The Thyssen family traces its origins to Isaak Lambert Thyssen (–1773) who lived near Aachen in Germany.  Isaak's first marriage to Johanna Wirtz produced a son Nikolaus Thyssen, who married and had a son of the same name, and he a son named Friedrich (1804–1877).  Friedrich, a banker and wire producer, married his cousin Katharina Thyssen in 1838 and had two sons, August and Joseph.

August Thyssen founded the Thyssen Steel conglomerate and with wife Hedwig Pelzer had three children: Fritz, Heinrich, and Hedwig.  August's brother Joseph assisted him in his business and with his wife Klara Bagel had two children: Julius and Hans.

More recent descendants

Fritz Thyssen
Fritz Thyssen (1873–1951) was head of the Thyssen mining and steelmaking company and founder of Vereinigte Stahlwerke AG, the biggest mining and steel cartel in the world prior to World War II.  He was an early supporter of the Nazi Party, though this ended in 1938. He was found a "lesser offender" in the denazification tribunals after the war. In 1953 Vereinigte Stahlwerke AG was refounded as Thyssen AG, and with participation of his widow and daughter, merged with KruppHoesch to become ThyssenKrupp AG in 1997.

Fritz was married in 1900 to Amalie Zurhelle (1877–1965); the couple had a single child, Anna.

Anna (Anita) Thyssen (1909–1990), wed 1936 Gábor Ödön Ladislaus Josef Maria Graf Zichy de Zich et Vásonykeö (Graz, 1 May 1910 – 25 May 1974), son of count Ladislaus Zichy de Zich et Vásonykeö and Juliane Wittmann. Anita and Ödön divorced in 1946.

Friedrich-August aka Federico Augusto Count Zichy-Thyssen de Zich et Vásonykeö (1937–2014), he and his brother Claudio sold their remaining 16,6% in Thyssen AG in 1995; wed firstly 1960 Alayde Mutzenbecher (1943-), divorced; wed secondly 1976 Maria Stella Fratta Silvero (1950-), divorced 1984; wed thirdly 1987 Maria Inés Sellarés (1952-), divorced 1989; and wed fourthly 2002 Laura Arce (1958-)
Alejandro Augusto Count Zichy-Thyssen de Zich et Vásonykeö (1961-), wed 1992 Janaina da Silva, divorced. wed 2002 Anna Sazontyeva, divorced.
Katarina Countess Zichy-Thyssen de Zich et Vásonykeö (1996-)
Julia Pavlina Countess Zichy-Thyssen de Zich et Vásonykeö (2004-)
Marcia Amelia Countess Zichy-Thyssen de Zich et Vásonykeö (1963-)
Claudia Caroline Countess Zichy-Thyssen de Zich et Vásonykeö (1966-)
Federico Julian Ladislao Count Zichy-Thyssen de Zich et Vásonykeö (1978-), wed 2005 Carolina Valenzuela (1977-)
Federico Ladislao Count Zichy-Thyssen de Zich et Vásonykeö (2006-)
Gabriel Federico Count Zichy-Thyssen de Zich et Vásonykeö (1988-)
Claudio Count Zichy-Thyssen de Zich et Vásonykeö (1942-), wed firstly 1963 Elsa Barcellos (1944-), divorced 1980; wed secondly 1980 Christina Llacer (1960-)
Anna Christina Countess Zichy-Thyssen de Zich et Vásonykeö (1964-), wed 1985 Alejandro Moreno (1963-) with issue: Alejandro Moreno, Sophia Moreno, Bianca Moreno
Isabel Luise Countess Zichy-Thyssen de Zich et Vásonykeö (1966-), wed 1994 Philippe Franck Alexis Chiroussot-Chambeaux (1965-) with issue: Alexa Marianne Chiroussot-Chambeaux (1997-), Hélène Chiroussot-Chambeaux (1999-) and Nicolas Chiroussot-Chambeaux (2003-)
Claudio Eduardo Count Zichy-Thyssen de Zich et Vásonykeö (1971-), wed Florencia Badino (1973-) with issue: 
Tomas Count Zichy-Thyssen (2001-) 
Maximiliano Count Zichy-Thyssen (2006-) 
Emilia Countess Zichy-Thyssen (2010-)
Augusto Count Zichy-Thyssen de Zich et Vásonykeö (1974-), wed Maria Eugenia de Andrade (1975-) with issue: 
Matias Count Zichy-Thyssen (2008-) 
Felipe Count Zichy-Thyssen (2010-)
Cynthie Janine Countess Zichy-Thyssen de Zich et Vásonykeö (1981-)
Yasmine Kristen Countess Zichy-Thyssen de Zich et Vásonykeö (1984-)
Amelie Justine Countess Zichy-Thyssen de Zich et Vásonykeö (1987-), with issue: Shiloh J. Gort, Kalaya C. Gort, and Hezekiah M. Gort

Heinrich Thyssen
Heinrich Freiherr Thyssen-Bornemisza de Kászon et Impérfalva (1875–1947), refused to participate in the Vereinigte Stahlwerke AG of his brother Fritz in 1926 and founded his own enterprise, including his father's foreign investments and some German companies apart from the Thyssen steelworks: August Thyssensche Unternehmungen des In- und Auslandes GmbH, today  TBG (Thyssen-Bornemisza Group) Holdings N.V., wed 1stly 1906 Margit Freiin Bornemisza de Kászon et Impérfalva (1887–1971), divorced 1932 with issue; wed 2ndly 1932 Else (Maud) Zarske adopted Feller (1909–), divorced 1937 without issue; wed 3rdly 1937 Gunhild von Fabrice (1908–2008), divorced 1945 without issue
Henrik Gábor István Ágost Baron Thyssen-Bornemisza de Kászon et Impérfalva (1907–1981) (called Stephen), wed 1stly 1929 Elisabeth Clarkson, wed 2ndly 1932 Ilona Kugler (1905–1992), wed 3rdly 1946 Ingeborg Muller, without issue (though I. Muller had a daughter, Birgit Muller (born 1942) from a previous marriage) 
Margit Gabriella Lujza Baroness Thyssen-Bornemisza de Kászon et Impérfalva (1911–1989), aka "The Killer Countess", wed 1933 Johann (Iván) Maria Josef Ladislaus Count Batthyány de Német-Ujvar (1910–1985)
Johann Ladislaus Heinrich Maria Count Batthyány de Német-Ujvar (1934–1967)
Robert Heinrich Maria Count Batthyány de Német-Ujvar (born 1935), wed 1966 Christine Riechert (born 1938)
Tatiana Christina Maria Countess Batthyány de Német-Ujvar (1968–), wed 1993 Konrad Count von Waldersee (born 1957) (sixth grandson in male line of Leopold III, Prince of Anhalt-Dessau), with issue: Heinrich Count von Waldersee (born 1996), Laura Countess von Waldersee (1998-) and László Count von Waldersee (born 2000)
Iván Christof Count Batthyány de Német-Ujvar (born 1979), wed 2009 Carolin Nauber
Gabrielle Wilhelmine Hedwige Marie Baroness Thyssen-Bornemisza de Kászon et Impérfalva (1915–), wed 1938 Adolf Willem Carel Baron Bentinck van Schoonheten (1905–1970), with issue:
Baroness Anita Tanya Thyssen DeCoste (1958–2019), wed firstly Andrew Rothschild (1977–1990), wed secondly to Christopher DeCoste, had two children, Baron Jarod Kenneth Wilhelm Thyssen DeCoste (1999), and Baroness Magdalene Sophie Thyssen DeCoste (2001). The majority of their holdings are now kept in DeCoste Biotechnological Engineering (2018), founded by Baron Jarod Kenneth Wilhelm Thyssen DeCoste.

Henriette Louise Maria Baroness Bentinck van Schoonheten (1949–2010), wed firstly 1967 Spencer Compton, 7th Marquess of Northampton (born 1946), divorced 1973 with issue; wed secondly Richard Thompson, divorced without issue; wed thirdly 1978 Serge Boissevain (1947–2011), with issue
Carel Johannes Baron Bentinck van Schoonheten (born 1957), wed firstly Nora de Picciotto (ex-wife of Prince Adam Karol Czartoryski), divorced; and wed secondly to Lisa Hogan, actress, divorced, with issue by second marriage:

Hans Heinrich, Baron Thyssen-Bornemisza de Kászon et Impérfalva, aka "Heini" (1921–2002), founder of the Thyssen-Bornemisza Museum in Madrid
1st marriage 1946–50 with Princess Maria Theresa Amalia of Lippe-Weissenfeld (1925–2008), with issue (a son that the alleged biological father is their brother-in-law Count Iván Batthyány de Német-Ujvar) :
Georg Heinrich, Baron Thyssen-Bornemisza de Kászon et Impérfalva, aka "Heini Junior" (1950-2022), chairman of TBG, who has one son by Catharina Eleonore Countess von Meran-Brandhofen (1967–)
Simon Thyssen-Bornemisza de Kászon et Impérfalva (2001–)

2nd marriage 1954–56 with Nina Sheila Dyer (1930–1965), she wed secondly 1957 Prince Sadruddin Aga Khan
3rd marriage 1956–65 with Fiona Frances Elaine Campbell-Walter (1932-), daughter of Rear Admiral Keith McNeill Campbell-Walter, with issue:
Baroness Francesca Anne Thyssen-Bornemisza de Kászon et Impérfalva (1958-), wed 1993 Karl Habsburg-Lothringen, Archduke of Austria-Hungary, Head of the Imperial House of Habsburg, separated 2003 and divorced 2017, with issue:
Archduchess Eleonore of Austria (1994-)
Archduke Ferdinand Zvonimir of Austria (1997-)
Archduchess Gloria of Austria (1999-)
Baron Lorne Thyssen-Bornemisza de Kászon et Impérfalva (1963-) converted to Islam, wed Alexandra Wright, with issue:
Baroness Julia Thyssen-Bornemisza (2006-)
4th marriage 1967-84 with Denise Shorto (1942-), with issue:
Baron Wilfried Alexander August Thyssen-Bornemisza de Kászon et Impérfalva (1974-)
5th marriage 1985 with María del Carmen Rosario Soledad "Tita" Cervera Fernández de la Guerra (1943-)
Borja Thyssen-Bornemisza (1980-) (Tita's natural son, adopted by his stepfather Baron Hans Heinrich Thyssen-Bornemisza) wed 2007 Blanca Cuesta, with issue:
Sacha Thyssen-Bornemisza (2008-)
Eric Thyssen-Bornemisza (2010-)

Hedwig Thyssen
Hedwig Thyssen (1878–1950), wed firstly 1899 Ferdinand Freiherr von Neufforge (1869–1942), divorced 1908; wed secondly 1908 Maximilian (Max) Freiherr von Berg (1859–1924), separated; with issue, three daughters and a natural son (this last who used his mother's maiden name) 
Hedwig Freiin von Neufforge (1900–1962), wed firstly 1918 Tassilo Freiherr von Berg (1897–1962), divorced 1923; wed secondly 1924 Gustav Edler von Remiz (1888–1939)
Dagmar Baroness von Berg (1919–), wed firstly 1954 Joseph Graf von Ledebur-Wicheln (1899–1963); wed secondly 1967 Juan Manuel de Celorrio (1920–)
Carlos Count von Ledebur-Wicheln (1954-), wed 1981 Claudia di Baja (1956-), with issue: Alexandra Countess von Ledebur-Wicheln (1982-), Dominique Countess von Ledebur-Wicheln (1985-), Patrick Count von Ledebur-Wicheln (1989-) and Maximilian Count von Ledebur-Wicheln (1998-)
Huberto Count von Ledebur-Wicheln (1956-), wed 1994 Maria Alejandra Mettler, with issue: Maria Victoria Countess von Ledebur-Wicheln (1995-) and José Igneus Count von Ledebur-Wicheln (1998-) 
Maximiliane Freiin von Berg (1908–2004), wed firstly 1927 Viktor Freiherr Seßler von Herzinger (1901-), divorced 1933; wed secondly 1935 Ernst Cassione (1894-), divorced 1937; wed thirdly 1937 Roman Marquart (1900-1944), divorced 1944; wed fourthly 1945 Béla Orgoványi-Hanstein (1907–), divorced 1962, with issue from the last:
Attila Orgoványi-Hanstein (1946–1987), wed Britta Winternitz (1941-), with issue:
Diana Orgoványi-Hanstein (1971-), wed 2010 Johannes Erbprinz zu Schwarzenberg (1967-; son of Karel Prince zu Schwarzenberg) 
Ildikó Orgoványi-Hanstein (1951-), wed 1983, as his third wife (divorced 1990) to Antal Baron Lipthay de Kisfalud et Lubelle (1946-; whose children, by this marriage, adopted the Freiherren von Berg name)
Christoph Freiherr von Berg (1983-)
Antonia Freiin von Berg (1986-)
Valentin Freiherr von Berg (1986-)
Mignonne Freiin von Berg (1917–1958), wed 1939 Count Friedrich of Wurmbrand-Stuppach (1904–1997), divorced 1945, without issue
Bodo Thyssen (1918–2004), wed 1969 (divorced 1989) Renate (née Kerkhoff, born 1939-; her children by her previous marriage, with Helmut Friedhelm Homey, adopted the Thyssen name):
Gabriella Renate Thyssen (1963-) wed firstly 1991 as his second wife, Prince Karl Emich of Leiningen (divorced 1998); and secondly 1998 The Aga Khan IV (separated 2004, and divorced 2011); issue born of both marriages
Joachim Helmut Thyssen (1964-)

Julius and Hans
Julius Thyssen (1881–1946)

Hans Thyssen (1890–1943)

Notes

References

 
People named in the Panama Papers